Amir Husain is a Pakistani-American artificial intelligence (AI) entrepreneur, founder of the Austin-based company, SparkCognition, and author of the book, The Sentient Machine.

Childhood & Education
Husain was born in Lahore, Punjab, Pakistan. His father was a businessman while his mother was an educator. At the age of four, Husain interacted with his first computer: A Commodore 64. Amazed by what the machine could do, he went back to his room and started building a contraption of a computer out of toys and cardboard, starting his lifelong obsession with computer science. He dropped out of middle school in the eighth grade, and began writing software and selling it for a profit. At the age of 15, Husain began attending the Punjab Institute of Computer Science from which he graduated two years later with a bachelor's degree in computer science.

After graduating, Husain spent time searching for an ideal research organization, and eventually found the Distributed Multimedia Computing Laboratory (DMCL) at the University of Texas at Austin, Texas. He joined UT Austin in 1996, but upon arrival was denied entrance to the Masters program, because of his young age. He then spent a year in the Bachelors program in computer science and obtained a second BS degree from the University of Texas at Austin. While still an undergraduate, he obtained his desired position at DMCL. In 1999, while working towards his Ph.D., Husain dropped out and launched his first start-up, Kurion.

Career
Husain launched Kurion in 1999, a web services company offering website personalization engines.

In 2002, the second startup he had founded, Inframanage, merged with ClearCube Technology. Husain became Chief Technology Officer at ClearCube, and later, CEO of ClearCube's software spin-off.

In 2013, Husain founded SparkCognition, an artificial intelligence company. His first investor at the new company was Michael Dell. Boeing, CME Group, Verizon, State Street and others followed. Since its inception, the company has gained clients such as Apergy, Boeing and Aker BP, Honeywell Aerospace, Flowserve, and Defense Innovation Unit. As of 2019 June, SparkCognition has raised more than $72.5M through VC investors.

In 2018, Husain became CEO of SkyGrid, a joint venture between Boeing and SparkCognition aimed at developing an aerial operating system that uses AI and blockchain technology to integrate autonomous cargo and passenger aircraft into the aerospace industry.

Awards, Patents, & Achievements

Husain has been named Top Technology Entrepreneur of the Year by the Austin Business Journal. Other awards he has received include being listed as an Onalytica Top 100 Artificial Intelligence Influencer, receiving the Austin Under 40 Technology and Science Award in 2016, and being a finalist for EY Entrepreneur of the Year in 2018.

Husain has 33 awarded patents to his name, and several dozen additional patents pending. He has been published in journals such as Network World  Computerworld, and the U.S. Naval Institute’s Proceedings, along with major news outlets such as Foreign Policy. A computer designed by Husain is in the collection of the Computer History Museum in Mountain View, California. He served on the Board of Advisors for IBM Watson and the University of Texas at Austin’s Department of Computer Science, and is a member of the Council on Foreign Relations. He has also received various awards from CRN, Nokia, PC World, and VMworld, among others.

Personal life
Husain married Zaib (née Iqtidar) in 2002. He lives in Austin, Texas.

Bibliography

References

20th-century births
Living people
Pakistani businesspeople
Pakistani emigrants to the United States
University of Texas at Austin alumni
People from Lahore
People from Austin, Texas
Year of birth missing (living people)